Panesthia is a large genus of burrowing giant cockroach in the subfamily Panesthiinae. It is subsocial and its species are mainly found in Southeast Asia, coastal East Asia, Australasia, and Indo-Malaysia.

Species list 

Panesthia ancaudellioides Roth & L. M. 1977
Panesthia angustipennis (Illiger 1801)
Panesthia antennatav  Brunner von Wattenwyl 1893
Panesthia asahinai  Roth & L. M. 1979
Panesthia australis  Brunner von Wattenwyl 1865
Panesthia bilobata  Bei-Bienko 1965
Panesthia birmanica  Brunner von Wattenwyl 1893
Panesthia bougainvillensis  Roth & L. M. 1979
Panesthia celebica  Brunner von Wattenwyl 1893
Panesthia concinna  Feng, P. & Woo 1990
Panesthia cribrata  Saussure 1864
Panesthia cyclopensis  Roth & L. M. 1979
Panesthia flavipennis  Wood-Mason 1876

Panesthia gurneyi  Roth & L. M. 1979
Panesthia heurni  Roth & L. M. 1979
Panesthia karimuiensis  Roth & L. M. 1979
Panesthia larvata  Bei-Bienko 1969
Panesthia lata  Walker & F. 1868
Panesthia lobipennis  Brunner von Wattenwyl 1893
Panesthia lucanoides  (Butler 1882)
Panesthia luteoalata  Hanitsch 1937
Panesthia matthewsi  Roth & L. M. 1977
Panesthia mearnsi  Caudell 1924
Panesthia missimensis  Roth & L. M. 1979
Panesthia modiglianii  Hanitsch 1932
Panesthia monstruosa  Wood-Mason 1876
Panesthia morosa  Kirby & W. F. 1903
Panesthia morsus  (Butler 1882)
Panesthia necrophoroides  Walker & F. 1868
Panesthia obscura  (Saussure 1873)
Panesthia obtusa  Shaw 1918
Panesthia ornata  Saussure 1873
Panesthia papuensis  Roth & L. M. 1979
Panesthia paramonstruosa  Roth & L. M. 1979
Panesthia parva  Shaw 1918
Panesthia plagiata  Walker & F. 1859
Panesthia puncticollis  Stål 1877
Panesthia pygmaea  Princis 1951
Panesthia quadriporosa  Roth & L. M. 1979
Panesthia quinquedentata  Kirby & W. F. 1903
Panesthia regalis  Walker & F. 1868
Panesthia rufipennis  Princis 1957
Panesthia saussurei  Stål 1877
Panesthia sedlaceki  Roth & L. M. 1979
Panesthia serrata  Saussure 1895
Panesthia shelfordi  Hanitsch 1923
Panesthia sinuata  Saussure 1895
Panesthia sloanei  Shaw 1918
Panesthia stellata  Saussure 1895
Panesthia strelkovi  Bei-Bienko 1969
Panesthia tepperi  Kirby & W. F. 1903
Panesthia toxopeusi  Roth & L. M. 1979
Panesthia transversa  Burmeister 1838
Panesthia triangulifera  Hanitsch 1927
Panesthia tryoni  Shaw 1918
Panesthia urbani  Roth & L. M. 1979
Panesthia wallacei  Wood-Mason 1876

References 

Cockroach genera